The China Grove Plantation is a historic Southern plantation in Natchez, Adams County, Mississippi.

Location
It is located in South Natchez, near Sibley.

History
The wood-framed cottage was built in 1854. It has two main rooms, cabinets and galleries. In 1854, James Railey, who already owned the Oakland Plantation, purchased this property. However, after his death, his heirs lost the property due to a chancery lawsuit.

A few years after the American Civil War of 1861–1865, in 1869, former slaves Auguste Mazique and his wife Sarah purchased the property at a public auction. They became the largest landowners in southwestern Adams County by the end of the nineteenth century.

It has been added to the National Register of Historic Places since April 7, 1982.

References

Houses on the National Register of Historic Places in Mississippi
Houses in Natchez, Mississippi
Plantation houses in Mississippi
National Register of Historic Places in Natchez, Mississippi